Maricel Morales is a Filipino actress, beauty queen and politician.

Career

Morales was crowned Mutya ng Pilipinas in 1995.

Personal life

Morales was formerly married to actor Ace Espinosa.

Filmography

Television

Film

References

External links
 

Living people
Star Magic
Mutya ng Pilipinas winners
Year of birth missing (living people)